Emilia de Poret, née Andreen (born 10 August 1976), is a Swedish singer, fashion designer and editor.

Career
She made her debut under the name  Lia Andreen in the summer of 2001 with the music single "Mistreat Me (You'll Be Sorry)", from the album “Back were I belong” which peaked at number 34 on the Swedish music single chart. Her second album “A lifetime in a moment” peaked at number 20 in the Swedish album chart.

“Pick Me Up” was the title of de Porets third music album, during the summer of 2008 the music single with the same name placed number one of the Swedish singles chart and sold triple platina. During 2008 and 2009 she placed in the charts in Australia and Spain.

Richard Vissions remix of  “Pick me Up”  was released in 2009 and charted in the American Billboard charts Dance chart. And peaked at place 25. In 2010 the song “This ain’t a love song” was released in Japan and Australia.

After 2010, de Poret has focused on fashion and design, and started working with Liberty of London, and her prints became a part of the collection "Liberty Rocks".  She has also been an editor for ELLE Magazine in Sweden.

She has along with her friend Ebba von Sydow written the book Säker stil, they also has a style-pod broadcast together.

Personal life
Emilia de Poret is married to the Swiss attorney Amaury de Poret. The couple have two children together.

Bibliography 
2015 - Säker stil (with Ebba von Sydow)
2017 - Säker stil - 101 stiltips (with Ebba von Sydow)

References

External links 

1975 births
Living people
Swedish songwriters
Swedish designers
21st-century Swedish singers
21st-century Swedish women singers